Mario Renato Menéndez Rodríguez (born 1937 in Mérida, Yucatán, Mexico) is the director-general of Por Esto!, one of the largest daily newspaper in Mérida, Yucatán, Mexico. He was the first Mexican to interview Fidel Castro after the Cuban revolution.

External links 
 Por Esto!

References 

1937 births
Living people
Mexican journalists
Male journalists
Date of birth missing (living people)